Zheng Xuejian (born 23 February 2001) is a Chinese footballer currently playing as a midfielder at Zhejiang.

Club career
Zheng Xuejian would play for the Jiangsu youth team before being selected for the Chinese U17 team. He would go on to be promoted to the Jiangsu senior in the 2020 league season before being loaned out to the Chinese U19 team, who were allowed to participate within the third tier of the Chinese football league pyramid. After his loan period ended and he would return to Jiangsu he would discover that on 28 February 2021, the parent company of the club Suning Holdings Group announced that operations were going to cease immediately due to financial difficulties.

Zhang would be free to join second tier club Nanjing City in the 2021 league season and would go on to make his debut in a league game on 30 April 2021 against Chengdu Rongcheng in a 2-0 defeat. He would go on to establish himself as vital member of their team throughout the season and would even go out on loan to the Chinese U20 team who participated within the Chinese third tier. On 17 February 2022 he would transfer to top tier club Zhejiang. He would go on to make his debut in a Chinese FA Cup game on 18 November 2022 against Dalian Professional in a 1-0 victory.

Career statistics
.

Notes

References

External sources
 

2001 births
Living people
Chinese footballers
China youth international footballers
Association football midfielders
China League Two players
China League One players
Jiangsu F.C. players